Irakli Modebadze (born 4 October 1984) is a retired Georgian professional footballer.

From 2002 until 2007 he played for Ukrainian side FC Metalurh Zaporizhya. On 13 March 2009 he signed a contract with FC Chornomorets Odessa until the end of the 2008/09 season. The forward played the 2011/2012 season for FC Metalurgi Rustavi, the reformed club of Olimpi Rustavi. 

He fouled on 14 July 2012 in an friendly game with his club FC Dila Gori, in the game against FC Rot-Weiss Erfurt the Libanese footballer Joan Oumari and provokes the breakup of the game. 

His older brother Giorgi, is also a footballer.

References

External links

  Profile on official Chornomorets Website
 

Footballers from Georgia (country)
Expatriate footballers from Georgia (country)
Georgia (country) international footballers
FC Chornomorets Odesa players
FC Metalurgi Rustavi players
FC Metalurh Zaporizhzhia players
Erovnuli Liga players
Ukrainian Premier League players
Expatriate footballers in Ukraine
Expatriate sportspeople from Georgia (country) in Ukraine
FC Dila Gori players
FC Dinamo Tbilisi players
1984 births
Living people

Association football forwards